Chuck Berry – In Concert is an album by Chuck Berry, released in 2002 by Magnum Records.

Track listing
 "Johnny B. Goode" (5:25)
 "School Days" (2:25)
 "Sweet Little Sixteen" (2:47)
 "Rock and Roll Music" (2:30)
 "In The Wee Wee Hours" (5:11)
 "Reelin' & Rockin'" (5:20)
 "Memphis Tennessee" (3:41)
 "My Ding-a-Ling" (5:22)
 "How High the Moon" (3:12)
 "Vacation Time" (2:30)
 "Chuck's Jam" (3:12)
 "Childhood Sweetheart" (3:18)
 "Changed" (3:17)
 "Too Much Monkey Business" (2:48)

Chuck Berry live albums
2002 live albums